Eight Hours Away from Being a Man is an album by the math rock band Roadside Monument, released in 1997.

Critical reception
The  Arkansas Democrat-Gazette thought that "this three-piece is miles ahead of the competition with their tough and spare tension-release rock songs."

AllMusic wrote: "Starting out with the blistering 'Sperm Ridden Burden' and ending with the groove-laden 'My Hands Are the Thermometers', somewhere in between the listener will find typical math rock fare, but not without its own share of creativity and drive."

Track listing
 "Sperm Ridden Burden" – 1:45
 "Eight Hours Away From Being A Man" – 4:10
 "John Wayne Marina" – 4:50
 "Sunken Anchor" – 3:02
 "Iowa Backroads" – 4:16
 "Kansas City" – 4:34
 "Tired Of Living With People Who Are Tired Of Living" – 4:03
 "Compressor District" – 7:12
 "Apartment Over The Peninsula" – 5:39
 "Crop Circles" – 5:22
 "My Hands Are The Thermometers" – 4:33

Credits
Aaron? – Engineer, Second Engineer
James Anthony – Artwork, Layout Design
Jeff Bettger – Organ, Piano
M. Blosenski – Violin
Johnathon Ford – Bass, vocals
Matt Johnson – Percussion instrument, drums
Douglas Lorig – Guitar, Vocals
A.W. Reizuch – Lettering
Bob Weston – Trumpet, Engineer

References

Roadside Monument albums
1997 albums
Tooth & Nail Records albums